Lumen can refer to:

 Lumen (unit), the SI unit of luminous flux
 Lumen (anatomy), the cavity or channel within a tubular structure
 Lumen (band), a Russian rock band
 Lumen (branding agency), a design and branding company headquartered in Milan, Italy
 The Lumen (Cleveland), a skyscraper in downtown Cleveland
 Lumen (novel), an 1887 book by Camille Flammarion
 Lumen (website), a database of Digital Millennium Copyright Act takedown requests
 141 Lumen, an asteroid
 Lumen Martin Winter (1908–1982), American artist
 Lumen Pierce, a fictional character in the television series Dexter
 Lumen Technologies, telecommunications company formerly known as CenturyLink
 Stellar Lumens, a cryptocurrency and payment network
 USS Lumen (AKA-30), a US Navy ship
 Lumen, a dating app owned by MagicLab

See also
 
 Luminal (disambiguation)